Beck – Mannen utan ansikte (English: Beck – The Man Without a Face) is a 2001 film about the Swedish police detective Martin Beck directed by Harald Hamrell.

Cast 
 Peter Haber as Martin Beck
 Mikael Persbrandt as Gunvald Larsson
 Malin Birgerson as Alice Levander
 Marie Göranzon as Margareta Oberg
 Hanns Zischler as Josef Hillman
 Ingvar Hirdwall as Martin Beck's neighbour
 Rebecka Hemse as Inger (Martin Beck's daughter)
 Jimmy Endeley as Robban
 Mårten Klingberg as Nick
 Peter Hüttner as Oljelund
 Fikret Cesmeli as Hammad
 Amir Barghashi as Hassan Ahmed
 Michalis Koutsogiannakis as Tahmed Ahmed
 Stina Ekblad as Angelica Beckman
 Leif Andrée as Jörgen Beckman

References

External links 

2000s Swedish-language films
Martin Beck films
2001 television films
2001 films
2000s crime films
Films directed by Harald Hamrell
2000s police procedural films
2000s Swedish films